Calwell is a surname which may refer to:

Arthur Calwell (1896–1973), Opposition Leader of Australia
Bert Calwell (1898–1962), Australian rules footballer
Clarrie Calwell (1896–1975), Australian rules footballer
George Calwell (1891–1971), Australian rules footballer

See also
Places named for Arthur Calwell:
Division of Calwell, electoral division in the state of Victoria, Australia
Calwell, Australian Capital Territory, suburb of Canberra, Australia
Caldwell (disambiguation)